Jack Mates  ( – date of death unknown) was a Welsh international footballer. He was part of the Wales national football team between 1891 and 1897, playing 3 matches.

Mates was a member of the Chirk team that won the Welsh Cup in 1889–90, and was one of twenty internationals to have originated from the club. He played his first match for Wales on 7 February 1891 against Ireland and his last match on 29 March 1897 against England.

See also
 List of Wales international footballers (alphabetical)

References

1870 births
Welsh footballers
Wales international footballers
Chirk AAA F.C. players
Place of birth missing
Year of death missing
Association footballers not categorized by position